Uprising is the second album by the Swedish synthpop band Universal Poplab, released November 29, 2006 through Wonderland Records. The album was preceded by two singles, "I Could Say I'm Sorry" and "Heart Apart".

Track listing
"Soma Generation" – 3:38
"I Could Say I'm Sorry" – 3:38
"Fire" – 2:40
"Heart Apart" – 3:39
"White Night" – 3:29
"Black Love Song" – 4:46
"Vampire in You" – 3:34
"60 Is the New 40" – 5:00
"Go Back to Sleep" – 3:43
"The Message" – 3:58
"Sad Song" – 4:00
"New Beginnings" – 4:55

Singles
"I Could Say I'm Sorry" (2006)
"Heart Apart" (2006)
"Fire" (2007)

Credits
Christer Lundberg – vocals
Paul Lachenardière
Hans Olsson

References

2006 albums
Universal Poplab albums